Eduard Kanhäuser, also known as Edi (born 18 September 1901-missing in action 22 May 1944) was an Austrian international footballer. Kanhäuser played as a goalkeeper for Wiener Sport-Club. His brother was fellow player Karl Kanhäuser.

World War II and death
Kanhauser served as an Unteroffizier (Corporal) in the German Army in World War II. He was reported missing in action in Italy on 22 May 1944 aged 42 and is commemorated at the German Military Cemetery at Monte Cassino.

References

1901 births
1944 deaths
Austrian footballers
Austria international footballers
Wiener Sport-Club players
Association football goalkeepers
German Army personnel killed in World War II
German Army soldiers of World War II
Missing in action of World War II